The 1975 World Wrestling Championships were held Minsk, Soviet Union at Minsk Sports Palace. Greco-Roman wrestling competition was held 11–14 September, while freestyle wrestlers competed 15–18 September.

Medal table

Team ranking

Medal summary

Men's freestyle

Men's Greco-Roman

References

 FILA Database

World Wrestling Championships
Wrestling
Wrestling
Wrestling